Sondalo (Sondel in Valtellinese dialect) is a comune (municipality) in the Province of Sondrio in the Italian region Lombardy, located about  northeast of Milan and about  northeast of Sondrio.

Sondalo borders the following municipalities: Grosio, Ponte di Legno, Valdisotto, Valfurva, Vezza d'Oglio.

Sondalo is home to the E. Morelli Hospital, a 3000-bed facility formerly run as a tuberculosis sanitarium.

Demographic evolution

Notable people 
 The Italian ski mountaineers Mattia Coletti, Elisa Fleischmann, Lorenzo Holzknecht and Guido Giacomelli were born in Sondalo.

References

External links
 Official website

Cities and towns in Lombardy